New York State Route 456 (NY 456) was a short state highway located entirely within the town of Beekmantown in Clinton County, New York, in the United States. The western terminus of the route was at an intersection with NY 22 by the community of Beekmantown (also called Beekmantown Corners) and the eastern terminus was at a junction with U.S. Route 9 (US 9) east of Interstate 87 (I-87) and west of Point Au Roche State Park. NY 456 was assigned in April 1970 and is maintained by the Clinton County Highway Department as County Route 58 (CR 58). The route was decommissioned on March 18, 2015.

Route description

NY 456 began at an intersection with NY 22 in the town of Beekmantown. Maintained by the county as CR 58 and known locally as Spellman Road, NY 456 proceeded east through a residential section of Beekmantown and past the Cumberland Head Library. Just after crossing the junction with Ashley Road, the route crossed over tracks owned by the Canadian Pacific Railway and used by Amtrak on its Adirondack service. Remaining a two-lane residential road through Beekmantown, NY 456 continued past a junction with Ron-Cathy Road and into an interchange with the Adirondack Northway (I-87) (exit 40). Two blocks after the interchange with the Northway, NY 456 reached a junction with US 9 just northwest of Point Au Roche State Park.

History
NY 456 was assigned in April 1970 to its current alignment. Although the route is signed as a state highway, it has been maintained by Clinton County since its inception. The route was originally concurrent with the unsigned CR 32; however, it is now inventoried by the county as CR 58. The route was decommissioned on March 18, 2015, and removed from the state logs.

Major intersections

See also

List of county routes in Clinton County, New York

References

External links

456
Transportation in Clinton County, New York